The American Business Forum in Turkey (AmCham Turkey/ABFT) is a business association and NGO, composed of 125 or more U.S. companies with operations in Turkey. It was founded in 2004 as an American Chamber of Commerce, and it is focused on promoting a positive business agenda and commercial environment in Turkey and on strengthening bilateral trade, investment, and relations between Turkey and the U.S. through committee activities, access, visibility, business services, and networking opportunities.

AmCham Turkey/ABFT represents 125 or more U.S. member firms with investments over $50 billion having created more than 60.000 jobs in Turkey. It endeavors to be a credible, respected and effective partner and bridge between the public and private sectors in Turkey and the U.S.

An elected Board of Directors oversees AmCham and chooses one of its members to serve as Chairman for a two-year term. The current Board of Directors consists of ten members and is chaired by Serra Akcaoglu, Citibank Turkey CEO and Board Member. AmCham operations run by three full-time staff members. Elif Demircan has been the Executive Director since 2012.

Click to see the AmCham Turkey/ABFT's Board of Directors.

History
AmCham Turkey/ABFT was founded in February 2004 with 34 member companies. It was awarded with the affiliation as an American Chamber of Commerce by the U.S. Chamber of Commerce in December 2004.

Membership
AmCham Turkey/ABFT represents 125+ U.S. member companies with operations in Turkey, including leading firms across every industry, from banking to information and communication technologies, from healthcare to financial and legal services.

The membership is open to major U.S. corporations, small and medium size businesses, NGOs and U.S. citizens that share a common interest in the mission of the Chamber. The list of members can be seen here.

AmCham Turkey/ABFT offers three types of membership: Platinum, Gold and Silver. For membership definitions, services and diverse benefits, click here.

Activities
AmCham Turkey/ABFT builds its work around the following foundations: Networking, Access, Business Services, Committee Activities, and Visibility.

Networking
AmCham Turkey/ABFT hosts several exclusive events throughout the year for its members, all planned to help its members’ businesses develop. The events provide extensive networking opportunities, allowing members and guests to listen to the views of prominent investment and business figures and facilitate the building of sector specific platforms.

According to the Annual Activity Report of 2014, AmCham Turkey/ABFT organized a total of 57 networking events and activities in the year 2014.

Access
AmCham Turkey/ABFT provides access to reliable and qualified information through its Business and Investment Climate in Turkey annual reports, member profile surveys, business studies and sector-specific reports.

The Association each year conducts "Business and Investment Climate in Turkey" survey series to provide a tool for its works in order to strengthen the business and investment environment in Turkey. The Survey, conducted online, analyzes the perceptions of U.S. company executives on the general investment climate in Turkey, macroeconomic situation, infrastructure, taxation system, education system and workforce in Turkey, asking for their views for today and for the future.

Click here to access AmCham Turkey/ABFT's survey series since the year 2008.

Advocacy
AmCham Turkey/ABFT identifies, represents, and voices its members' interests, helps them gain access to public representatives, and support members to find solutions to business challenges. The roots of its advocacy efforts are guided by its Committees.

Committees
AmCham Committees provide a forum for U.S. companies to raise issues about the business climate in Turkey, identify trends and seize opportunities in the market. Committees operate on the following key issues:

 Ethics and Compliance
 Healthcare
 Information and Communication Technologies (ICT) 
 Intellectual Property Rights (IPR) 
 Public Affairs
 Corporate Social Responsibility
 Aerospace and Defense

Visibility
AmCham Turkey/ABFT assists its members' marketing efforts through its website, quarterly newsletters, and active social media platforms. In addition to these, AmCham organizes special events that provide great visibility to its members via sponsorship opportunities, further contributing to members’ marketing efforts.

AmCham Turkey/ABFT's quarterly newsletters are published online and can be accessed from here.

Business Services
The Association offers extensive and credible connections in the business arena. Its members can use this network to connect, communicate and stay on top of issues that impact their businesses. Alongside the opportunity to utilize this large network, AmCham provides its members certified executive trade missions, 1-to-1 business meetings, and free forum for disseminating business opportunities amongst members.

International Networks
AmCham Turkey/ABFT is an affiliate of the U.S. Chamber of Commerce headquartered in Washington D.C., the world’s largest business organization representing the interests of more than 3 million businesses of all sizes, sectors, and regions.

AmCham Turkey/ABFT is an active member of the AmChams in Europe, a network of chambers across Europe with a mission is to exchange best practice ideas, mutual member company benefits and to provide a forum for discussion, debate and where necessary representation on issues relevant to the European business environment.

Since its initiation, AmCham Turkey/ABFT is also an active member of the Middle East Commercial Center (MECC) of the U.S. Chamber of Commerce, a private sector-led alliance of business leaders from across the region working together to promote greater intra-regional trade and investment and collectively address today’s pressing economic issues and opportunities.

External links
 U.S. Chamber of Commerce
 AmChams in Europe

Sources
 AmCham Turkey/ABFT
 Embassy of the United States: Turkish-American Associations in Turkey
 AmCham Turkey/ABFT 10th Anniversary Video
 U.S. Secretary of Commerce Penny Pritzker Delivering Her Remarks at AmCham's 10th Anniversary Gala

American Chambers of commerce
Organizations established in 2004
Organizations based in Istanbul
2004 establishments in Turkey